Anda, officially the Municipality of Anda (Bolinao: Babali nin Anda; ;), is a 3rd class municipality in the province of Pangasinan, Philippines. Unique in this part of the province, The Sambalic language of Bolinao or Binubolinao is primarily spoken in the municipality and the adjacent town of Bolinao. According to the 2020 census, it has a population of 41,548 people.

The municipality consists primarily of Cabarruyan Island (also known as Anda Island), as well as minor surrounding islets. Because of Anda's proximity near the Hundred Islands, a popular tourist destination for its caves and beaches, it is the so-called "Mother of the Hundred Islands."

History 
On the north-west portion of Lingayen Gulf lies a group of islands which comprise the territory of Anda.

Before the middle of the nineteenth century, the islands which comprise the municipality were uninhabited. Only occasionally did seafarers and fishermen use the coast as havens.

Andres de la Cruz Cacho, fondly called in Bolinao as Andales Kulayo, discovered a vast tract of land suitable for grazing and fertile lowlands, and an abundant spring for agriculture. It was he who brought families from the town of Bolinao aboard a big boat and dispersed them on the island of Cabarruyan in 1842. The spread of population was rapid.

On May 10, 1842, the pioneers landed on what is now the barrio of Dolaoan, put up a settlement, and chose San Miguel Arcangel as their Patron Saint. On May 25, 1842, they established Carot and Cabungan with Santa Lucia as the common Saint of the two settlements.

In the first of June of same year, Tondol was founded. Sablig was settled in the middle of June. By the third week of June, Macaleeng was occupied.

No family was willing, to stay in Toritori at the time and so the place was bypassed. The settlers proceeded to Awile and Aruab (now Roxas) and by early July, they have established settlements in the area.

By August, Mal-Ong, Awag, Santa Rita, and San Nicolas were established. Within a period of only four months, May to August, 1842, the whole island of Cabarruyan was populated.

A steady stream of settlers followed the first pioneers and soon within a few years, the population was large enough to form a municipality.

In January, 1849 a conference of leaders was called by Don Pablo Cacho Valerio through his son Don Domingo with the end in view to established a new town. The leaders drafted a petition for the creation of a new town and sent copies on March 15, 1849, to Don Jose Sanchez y Guerrero, the then Alcalde at Iba, Zambales and to the Archbishop of Manila.

On May 26, 1849, the Alcalde brought the reply granting the petition. Accompanied by the Parish Priest, Rev. Fr. Juan Migrano, Capitan Felipe Cacho Valerio, and other municipal officials of Bolinao, the Alcalde came to Cabarruyan to choose a suitable location for the town site. They agreed on Segat in the center of the island which is now known as Namagbagan. The site for the plaza, church, town hall, convent, cemetery, and streets were laid out on January 20, 1850, by order of the Alcalde.

Anda was once a part of the municipality of Bolinao.

Geography

Barangays 
Anda is politically subdivided into 18 barangays. These barangays are headed by elected officials: Barangay Captain, Barangay Council, whose members are called Barangay Councilors. All are elected every three years.

 Awile
 Awag
 Batiarao
 Cabungan
 Carot
 Dolaoan
 Imbo
 Macaleeng
 Macando-candong
 Mal-ong
 Namagbagan
 Poblacion
 Roxas
 Sablig
 San Jose
 Siapar
 Tondol
 Tori-tori

Climate

Demographics

Language 
The people of Anda generally speak Pangasinan, Bolinao, and Ilocano.

Economy 

The town thrives on farming and deep-sea fishing.

In the past, progress in the town was sluggish due to its dependence to a landing barge to cross the Catubig Channel separating Anda to mainland Bolinao. In 1996, trade has increased due to a bridge connecting the municipality to the mainland. This bridge, known as Anda Bridge, was sponsored and inaugurated by then President Fidel V. Ramos, who hails from Pangasinan. Main roads have been concreted for faster access to the barangays, especially tourism related places.

Government
Anda, belonging to the first congressional district of the province of Pangasinan, is governed by a mayor designated as its local chief executive and by a municipal council as its legislative body in accordance with the Local Government Code. The mayor, vice mayor, and the councilors are elected directly by the people through an election which is being held every three years.

Elected officials

Transportation 

The town is accessible through land transportation. Two main bus companies serve commuters to and from Anda to Manila or neighboring towns and cities. These are Dagupan Bus Co., Inc.and Pangasinan Five Star Bus Co. Mini buses and jeepneys are also available for commuters going to neighboring towns and cities, like Alaminos and Dagupan.

Fossil Finds 

In the year 2000, fossils were found in barangay San Jose and barangay Awile. Fossils in barangay Awile were found only a few centimeters from the surface due to extensive erosion in the area. In San Jose, the fossils were discovered 3 meters from the ground surface. Most of the fossils were found in clay layer with limestone rubbles.

Among the faunal fossils discovered were from Stegodon sp., Elephas sp (large)., Elephas beyeri Von Koenigsvald (dwarf), Rhinoceros philippinensis, Cerpis sp. and Bovid sp.

See also

 List of islands of the Philippines

References

External links 

 Anda Profile at PhilAtlas.com
 Municipal Profile at the National Competitiveness Council of the Philippines
 Anda at the Pangasinan Government Website
 Anda Pangasinan
 Local Governance Performance Management System
 [ Philippine Standard Geographic Code]
 Philippine Census Information

Municipalities of Pangasinan
Islands of Pangasinan
Island municipalities in the Philippines